Nguyễn Quang Hồng (born Duy Xuyên, 1 October 1940) is a Vietnamese lexicographer and scholar at the Viện nghiên cứu Hán nôm in Hanoi. He is editor in chief of the standard dictionary of the ancient vernacular Chữ Nôm written language.

References

1940 births
Living people
Place of birth missing (living people)
Lexicographers
People from Quảng Nam province